Lyonetia euryella is a moth in the family Lyonetiidae. It is known from the islands of Honshu, Kyushu and Yakushima in Japan.

The wingspan is 8–10 mm. Adults are on wing from the beginning to the middle of May, from the middle of June to the beginning of July, from the end of July to the beginning of August and from the beginning of September to the beginning of October. There are four generations per year.

The larvae feed on Eurya japonica. They mine the leaves of their host plant. The mine has the form of an irregular upper surface linear-blotch mine. The early mined portion is dark yellow-orange margined with dark purplish-brown, while the freshly mined portion is yellowish-brown to yellowish-green. The mine extends towards the apex of the leaf along the margin and turns near the apex and returns towards the base along the other margin. Full-grown larvae leave the mine and spin a hammock-like cocoon on the lower side of the leaf.

External links
Revisional Studies On The Family Lyonetiidae Of Japan (Lepidoptera)

Lyonetiidae
Moths of Japan